Hustburg is an unincorporated community in Humphreys County, Tennessee. Hustburg Creek passes through the area. 

U.S. Senator from Arkansas Hattie Caraway grew up in Hustburg and attended its Ebenezer Church where she sang. She attended a one-room school house that may have been affiliated with the church before attending Dickson Normal School. More recent accounts state she went to "Ebenezer College" which seems a stretch.

Tribble High School served the community before it closed. Hustburg has had an Ebenezer Methodist Church.

In 1939 TVA released a report on the "readjustment problem" in Hustburg.

Hustburg is near where the Duck River meets the Tennessee River. A study using mosquito traps included Hustburg. Corn has been grown in the area known for its alluvial soil and as part of what's known as the "Big Bottom".

See also
New Johnsonville

References

Unincorporated communities in Humphreys County, Tennessee
Unincorporated communities in Tennessee